Lemboumbi-Leyou  is a department of Haut-Ogooué Province in south-eastern Gabon. The capital lies at Moanda. It had a population of 64,569 in 2013.

Towns and villages

References

Haut-Ogooué Province
Departments of Gabon